Martin Whiteford "Mr. Shortstop" Marion (December 1, 1917 – March 15, 2011) was an American Major League Baseball shortstop and manager. Marion played for the St. Louis Cardinals and the St. Louis Browns between 1940–1953. He was a defensive stalwart of the Cardinals' dynasty in the 1940s, which saw them win three World Series in a five year span, and was named the National League Most Valuable Player in 1944, the first shortstop in the history of the National League to win the award. Marion managed the Cardinals in 1951, the Browns from June 10, 1952, through 1953, and the Chicago White Sox from September 14, 1954 through 1956.

Baseball career

Marion was born in Richburg, South Carolina. He grew up in Atlanta, where he attended Tech High School and played baseball for the Georgia Tech Yellow Jackets. His older brother, Red Marion, was briefly an outfielder in the American League and a long-time manager in the minor leagues. Nicknamed "Slats", Marion had unusually long arms which reached for grounders like tentacles, prompting sportswriters to call him "The Octopus". A childhood leg injury deferred him from military service in World War II.

From 1940–50, Marion led the National League shortstops in fielding percentage four times, despite several other players being moved around the infield during these years. In 1941 he played all 154 games at shortstop (also a league-high) and in 1947 he made only 15 errors for a consistent .981 percentage.

Marion was also a better-than-average hitter for a shortstop. His most productive season came in 1942, when he hit .276 with a league-leading 38 doubles. In the 1942 World Series, one of four series in which he participated with the Cardinals, he helped his team to a World Championship. In 1943 he batted a career-high .280 in the regular season and hit .357 in the 1943 World Series.

He played with many second basemen throughout his career, including Frank "Creepy" Crespi. Marion commented after the 1941 season that Crespi's play was the best he ever saw by a second baseman. Crespi once took on Joe Medwick on the field (during a game) when he was trying to intimidate Marion. They remained friends until Crespi's death in 1990.

Marion's playing career was interrupted in 1951 by knee and back injuries. That season, he succeeded Eddie Dyer as manager of the Cardinals, leading them to an 80–73 record and a third place finish, but was replaced by Eddie Stanky at the end of 1951. He then moved to the American League Browns as a player-coach, and took the reins from Rogers Hornsby on June 10, 1952, as their player-manager. The last pilot in St. Louis Browns history, he was let go after the 1953 season when the Browns moved to Baltimore as the Orioles. He then signed as a coach for the White Sox for the 1954 campaign and was promoted to manager that September, when skipper Paul Richards left Chicago to take on the dual jobs of field manager and general manager in Baltimore. Marion led the White Sox for two-plus seasons, finishing third in the American League each time, before he stepped down at the end of 1956.

In 1958, Marion purchased the Double-A minor league Houston Buffaloes from the Cardinals, and successfully moved the team to the Triple-A level under the Chicago Cubs farm system.  He later sold the team to a group led by William Hopkins on August 16, 1960.  Hopkins then sold the team to the Houston Sports Association led by Roy Hofheinz who had obtained a major league franchise in the National League which became the Houston Astros.

Career statistics
In a 13-season career, Marion posted a .263 batting average with 36 home runs and 624 RBI in 1572 games. His career fielding percentage was .969. He made All-Star Game appearances from 1943–44 and 1946–1950 (There was no All-Star Game in 1945). In 1944, he earned the National League Most Valuable Player Award. As a manager, he compiled a 356–372 record.

Managerial record

Later life
In 1957, Marion and business partner Milton Fischman attempted to buy the Minneapolis Lakers of the National Basketball Association from owners Ben Berger and Morris Chalfen with the intention to move the team to Kansas City, Missouri. Instead, Berger and Chalfen sold the team to Bob Short, who moved the team to Los Angeles. Marion died of an apparent heart attack on March 15, 2011. He lived in Ladue, Missouri.

See also

 List of Major League Baseball annual doubles leaders
 List of Major League Baseball player–managers
 List of St. Louis Cardinals managers • Coaches

References

External links

1916 births
2011 deaths
Baseball players from South Carolina
Chicago White Sox coaches
Chicago White Sox managers
Georgia Tech Yellow Jackets baseball players
Huntington Red Birds players
Major League Baseball player-managers
Major League Baseball shortstops
National League All-Stars
National League Most Valuable Player Award winners
People from Chester County, South Carolina
Rochester Red Wings players
St. Louis Browns coaches
St. Louis Browns managers
St. Louis Browns players
St. Louis Cardinals coaches
St. Louis Cardinals managers
St. Louis Cardinals players
Baseball players from Atlanta